The deepwater dab (Poecilopsetta beanii) is a flatfish of the family Pleuronectidae. It can reach  in length. Its native habitat is the western Atlantic and Caribbean, from New England, USA, south through the Gulf of Mexico to Campeche, Mexico, and from the coast of Brazil to northern Colombia, the Leeward Islands, Windward Islands, and Cuba.

References

deepwater dab
Fish of the Western Atlantic
deepwater dab